The 1930 Wisconsin gubernatorial election was held on November 4, 1930.

Incumbent Republican Governor Walter J. Kohler Sr. was defeated in the Republican primary. 

Republican nominee Philip La Follette defeated Democratic nominee Charles E. Hammersley with 64.76% of the vote.

Primary elections
Primary elections were held on September 16, 1930.

Democratic primary

Candidates
Charles E. Hammersley, former attorney

Results

Republican primary

Candidates
Walter J. Kohler, Sr., incumbent Governor
Philip La Follette, former district attorney for Dane County

Results

Socialist primary

Candidates
Frank Metcalfe, County Supervisor and former member of the Wisconsin State Assembly

Results

Prohibition primary

Candidates
Adolph R. Bucknam, Prohibition nominee for U.S. Senate in 1922 and for Governor in 1924 and 1928
Henry Meisel
Alfred B. Taynton, former secretary of the Wisconsin prohibition state committee and unsuccessful candidate for Prohibition nomination for U.S. Senate in 1926

Results

General election

Candidates
Major party candidates
Charles E. Hammersley, Democratic
Philip La Follette, Republican

Other candidates
Alfred B. Taynton, Prohibition
Frank Metcalfe, Socialist
Fred B. Blair, Communist, former experimental college student

Results

References

Bibliography
 
 

1930
Wisconsin
Gubernatorial
November 1930 events